= Julian year =

Julian year may refer to:

- Julian year (astronomy), a time interval of exactly 365.25 Earth days
- Julian year (calendar), a year in the Julian calendar that is either 365 or 366 days, or 365.25 days on average
